Murrie Alexander Batt (born 6 October 1953) is a former Australian rules footballer who played with Collingwood in the Victorian Football League (VFL).

Notes

External links 

Murrie Batt's playing statistics from The VFA Project

1953 births
Australian rules footballers from Victoria (Australia)
Collingwood Football Club players
Preston Football Club (VFA) players
Living people